Marshall Buchanan Lang  TD (1868 – 3 October 1954) was a Church of Scotland minister and author.

He was born into an ecclesiastical family in  1868. John Marshall Lang, his father, was Moderator of the General Assembly of the Church of Scotland in 1893 and two of his brothers were bishops: Cosmo was Archbishop of Canterbury from 1928 to 1942 and Norman was Bishop suffragan of Leicester.

He was educated at Glasgow Academy and Glasgow University. He was Minister at Oldmeldrum, then at St John's (Cross) in Dundee from 1909  before moving to his father's former Kirk at Whittingehame in 1918.  He was Moderator of the General Assembly of the Church of Scotland in 1935. He died on  3 October 1954.

Notes

Alumni of the University of Glasgow
20th-century Ministers of the Church of Scotland
Moderators of the General Assembly of the Church of Scotland
People associated with Dundee
People educated at the Glasgow Academy
1868 births

1954 deaths